Dengie  is a village and civil parish in the Maldon district of Essex, England, with a population of 119 at the 2011 census.

It gives its name to the Dengie peninsula and hundred and to the Dengie Special Protection Area.

The place-name 'Dengie' is first attested in a manuscript of between 709 and 745, where it appears as Deningei. It appears as Daneseia in the Domesday Book of 1086. The name means 'Dene's island' or 'the island of Dene's people'.

The 14th-century church of St James is the parish Church for the village.

Dengie Flats, offshore, was used as a bombing and strafing range by the RAF and USAAF during the Second World War, and also attracted many crash-landing aircraft bound to or from the nearby RAF Bradwell Bay airfield. 
Between 1942 and 1945 Dengie was also the site of a 10-cm "Coast Defence" radar station used to warn of enemy ships and low-flying aircraft and doodlebugs.

(Sources—RAF record books at National Archive; USAF Missing in Action records;J P Foynes "Battle of the East Coast 1939-1945")

Dengie marshes were once used to film an episode of Doctor Who.

See also
 Dengie Hundred

References

External links 

  Information and photographs of Dengie Village
 -Click here to visit a Flickr group where anyone can upload & display their photos of the Dengie Hundred
 www.burnhamrotary.info - The Rotary Club of Burnham on Crouch & Dengie Hundred
  The history of Dengie Village

Villages in Essex
Maldon District